Dragon II, Dragon-2, dragon two, or variation, may refer to:

Space travel
 SpaceX Dragon 2, a class of space capsules manufacturered by SpaceX
 Dragon C2+ (May 2012), the second SpaceX Dragon mission
 SpaceX CRS-2 (March 2013; aka SpX-2), the second SpaceX ISS resupply
 Crew Dragon Demo-2 (May 2020; aka DM-2), the second Dragon 2 flight and its first crewed flight
 SpaceX Crew-2 (April 2021), the second operational SpaceX ISS crew transport

Other uses
 Dragon 2, a model of the biplane de Havilland Dragon
 Dragons II: The Metal Ages, a 2005 animated Mega-Blocks film
 Issue No. 2 of Dragon magazine
 M47 Dragon II, a shoulder-fired anti-tank missile

See also
 Dragon (disambiguation)
 Double Dragon (disambiguation)
 Twin Dragon (disambiguation)